The Trident School, located south of Trident, Montana, was built in 1911. It was listed on the National Register of Historic Places in 1981.

It is a one-story woodframe building which was started as a one-room schoolhouse in 1911 and expanded in 1914.  It was built to serve the company town of the Trident Cement Company, and, relatedly, has a stucco exterior.

References

Schools in Gallatin County, Montana
One-room schoolhouses in Montana
School buildings on the National Register of Historic Places in Montana
National Register of Historic Places in Gallatin County, Montana
School buildings completed in 1911
1911 establishments in Montana